Live & Direct is the second album of the Belgium Rap group Starflam.

Track listing
"33 RPM – 4:05	
"Monde confus – 3:05	
"Ce plat pays – 4:42	
"Choisis ton camp – 1:45	
"El Diablo – 4:19	
"Bled Runner – 4:41	
"Mic smokin' – 5:15	
"Dead man – 5:35

2000 albums
Starflam albums